Eastern Multi-academy Trust was formed , by resolution 9 May 2017, when the College of West Anglia withdrew its membership from the CWA Academy Trust.
It is sponsor of schools with academy status based in Norfolk, England, founded by The College of West Anglia.

The trust was founded to help improve primary and secondary education in the area, around the college's ethos of 'changing lives through learning'.

Academies
CWA Academy Trust in 2014 sponsored five academies in the Norfolk area, three of which are in King's Lynn and two of which are in Downham Market. These were King's Lynn Academy, founded in 2010, Downham Market Academy (2013), Eastgate Academy, Nelson Academy and King Edward VII Academy (2014).

Secondary schools
King's Lynn Academy, King's Lynn
Downham Market Academy, Downham Market
King Edward VII Academy, King's Lynn

In 2017, King's Lynn Academy was judged by Ofsted to be inadequate, and Downham Market Academy instructed to leave this trust.

Primary schools
Nelson Academy, Downham Market
Eastgate Academy, King's Lynn

These were joined by 
 Emneth, 
 North Wootton, 
 Southery
 Upwell academy.

References

External links
 Academy Trust website

Educational charities based in the United Kingdom
Charities based in Norfolk
Multi-academy trusts